Sergey Petrovich Pesteryev (12 January 1888 – 2 May 1942) was a Russian Empire cyclist. He competed in two events at the 1912 Summer Olympics. He was arrested by Soviet authorities and sentenced to five years in a labor camp in April 1940; he died in prison two years later. Pesteryev was posthumously rehabilitated in 1999.

References

External links
 

1888 births
1942 deaths
Male cyclists from the Russian Empire
Cyclists at the 1912 Summer Olympics
Sportspeople from Kharkiv
Soviet people who died in prison custody
Prisoners who died in Soviet detention